The American National Bank Building is a historic bank building located in Alamosa, Colorado. The two-story Arcaded Block-style building was constructed in 1909. The building's most distinctive architectural features are the tall, evenly spaced, rounded arches on the north and west sides of the building. The bank closed in 1951. It was occupied by a floral shop beginning in 1979. It was added to the National Register of Historic Places on April 15, 1999. It "was intended to show faith in the future of Alamosa" and it represents expansion to the area due to the Homestead Act of 1909.

References

External links
 Alamosa County listings at nationalregisterofhistoricplaces.com

Commercial buildings completed in 1909
Buildings and structures in Alamosa, Colorado
Commercial buildings on the National Register of Historic Places in Colorado
Bank buildings on the National Register of Historic Places in Colorado
National Register of Historic Places in Alamosa County, Colorado